Arneson (also Arnesson, Arnison) is a surname of Norwegian origin. Notable people with the surname include:
Dave Arneson (1947–2009), American game designer
Erni Arneson (1917–2006), Danish film actress
Finn Arnesson (died c. 1065), Norwegian nobleman and adviser to Olaf Haraldsson
Jim Arneson (born 1951), American football player
Lars Arnesson (born 1936), coach of the Swedish national football team
Mark Arneson (born 1949), American football player
Nicholas Arnesson (1150–1225), Norwegian bishop and nobleman during the Norwegian civil war era
Richard Arneson, political philosopher
Robert Arneson (1930–1992), American sculptor

See also
 Arneson River Theater, an outdoor theater in San Antonio, Texas

Swedish-language surnames